Labeo baldasseronii is a species of fish in the family Cyprinidae, the carps and minnows. It is known only from the type locality in Mozambique.

References 

Endemic fauna of Mozambique
Labeo
Fish of Mozambique
Fish described in 1948
Fauna of the Eastern Highlands